The 1981–82 Houston Cougars men's basketball team represented the University of Houston in NCAA Division I competition in the 1981–82 season. This was the first of Houston's famous Phi Slama Jama teams, led by Rob Williams, Michael Young, Larry Micheaux, and future Hall of Famer Clyde Drexler. Another future Hall of Famer, Hakeem Olajuwon, played sparingly off the bench that season.

Houston, coached by Guy Lewis, played its home games in the Hofheinz Pavilion in Houston, Texas, and was then a member of the Southwest Conference.

Roster

Schedule and results

|-
!colspan=9 style=| Regular season

|-
!colspan=9 style=| SWC Tournament

|-
!colspan=9 style=| NCAA Tournament

NCAA tournament
Midwest
Houston 94, Alcorn State 84
Houston 78, Tulsa 74
Houston 79, Missouri 78
Houston 99, Boston College 92
Final Four
 North Carolina 68, Houston 63

Rankings

Awards and honors
Rob Williams, 1st Team All-Southwest Conference
Rob Williams, Midwest Regional Most Outstanding Player
Rob Williams, All-SWC Tournament team
Clyde Drexler, 2nd Team All-Southwest Conference
Larry Micheaux, All Midwest Regional

Team players drafted into the NBA

References

External links
Jamfest for the Ages—2007 ESPN.com article commemorating Phi Slama Jama

Houston Cougars men's basketball seasons
NCAA Division I men's basketball tournament Final Four seasons
Houston
Houston
Houston
Houston